David Weatherston (born 25 August 1986) is a retired Scottish professional footballer who played for Queen's Park, St Johnstone, Queen of the South, Falkirk, Stirling Albion, Alloa Athletic, Brechin City and Verdal IL.

Career

Queen's Park
Born in Paisley and raised in Clarkston, East Renfrewshire, Weatherston began his career with Queen's Park in 2004 where he played in 78 league games, scoring 22 goals in three seasons. During his time at the club, he was voted into the Third Division Team of the Year in 2006–07.

St Johnstone
He joined St Johnstone in the summer of 2007 for one season, where he played in 27 league games without scoring a goal.

Queen of the South

Weatherston signed for Dumfries side Queen of the South on 27 August 2008. Weatherston made his debut with a substitute appearance in the 3–1 league defeat at Palmerston against Dundee on 30 August 2008. He scored his first goal for Queens in the following game in a 1–0 victory over Ross County.

In the top of table clash at Palmerston against Livingston on 4 October 2008, Weatherston scored his next two goals. The 6–1 victory saw Queens go top of the First Division for the first time in five years.

On 19 February 2011 Weatherston scored his first senior career hat trick in the 4–0 win away at Morton.

In his three seasons with the club, Weatherston played in 74 league games, scoring 17 goals.

Falkirk

He signed for Falkirk on 10 August 2011, signing a six-month deal until 3 January 2012. He made his Falkirk debut against Partick Thistle three days later. Falkirk won the match 2–1. He scored his first goal for Falkirk on 17 September 2011 in 2–1 win over Dundee. He made 33 appearances in total in season 2011/12, and in the Summer of 2012, signed a one-year extension to his deal.

Weatherston's 2012–13 campaign was to be blighted with injury however, not allowing him to get a consistent run in the team. He made 29 appearances, 9 of those coming from the bench. Weatherston was told in May 2013 he would not have his contract renewed by newly appointed manager Gary Holt, and left the club along with Darren Dods, Sean Higgins, Iain Flannigan and Dale Fulton.

Stirling Albion

On 8 August 2013, Weatherston signed for Scottish League Two side Stirling Albion on a one-year deal along with former Falkirk teammate Dale Fulton. He made his debut against Montrose coming on as a substitute in a 2–1 victory. He played a key role in helping Albion gain promotion through the League Two play-offs, teaming up with old Falkirk teammate Jordan White up front, forming a strong partnership. He finished the season having made 36 appearances in all competitions, scoring 9 goals.

Alloa Athletic
On 29 May 2014, Weatherston signed for Scottish Championship side Alloa Athletic, after leaving Stirling.

Verdal
On 12 September 2016, the last day of the transfer window, Verdal confirmed the signing of Weatherston, after attempts from the player to be contracted by Norwegian 1st Division side Levanger had failed.

Career Statistics

Club

Honours
Falkirk
Scottish Challenge Cup: 2011–12

Sporting Family

Weatherston is the cousin of professional golfer Martin Laird.

Notes

External links

David Weatherston Football

1986 births
Living people
Footballers from Paisley, Renfrewshire
Sportspeople from East Renfrewshire
Scottish footballers
Queen's Park F.C. players
St Johnstone F.C. players
Queen of the South F.C. players
Scottish Football League players
Falkirk F.C. players
Stirling Albion F.C. players
Scottish Professional Football League players
Alloa Athletic F.C. players
Association football forwards